Heavy Eyes may refer to:
Heavy Eyes (album), a 2018 album by Basement Revolver
"Heavy Eyes", a 2008 song from Rosewood Thieves
"Heavy Eyes", a song from the 1953 film Julius Caesar
"Heavy Eyes", a song by The Microphones from their 2002 release Song Islands
"Heavy Eyes", a 2008 song by Oh Land  from Fauna